Bidens chippii is a species of flowering plant in the family Asteraceae. It belongs to the genus Bidens.
The plant was at first named Coreopsis chippii after British botanist Thomas Ford Chipp (1886–1931)).

References

chippii
Endemic flora of South Sudan
Plants described in 1929